The Los Angeles Wolves were an American professional soccer team that played for two seasons. In 1967 they played in the United Soccer Association, finishing as champions, and in 1968 they were founding members of the North American Soccer League.

United Soccer Association
In 1966 a group of American and Canadian sports Entrepreneurs, led by Jack Kent Cooke,  formed the United Soccer Association with the intention of organizing a professional soccer league. The USA originally intended to launch its league in the spring of 1968. However a rival league, the National Professional Soccer League, announced it was ready to launch in 1967. Not wanting to lose ground to its rival, the USA decided to fast track its launch. Without any players of its own, it opted to import whole teams from Europe and South America. It was intended that these teams would represent the franchises during the inaugural season, giving them time to build their own squads for the following season. Wolverhampton Wanderers, who had won promotion to the English First Division at the end of the 1966–67 season subsequently represented the Los Angeles franchise. Cooke had originally intended to call the team the Los Angeles Zorros, but when the agreement with Wolverhampton Wanderers was made, it was decided to use their nickname of Wolves.

Wolves played in the Western Division alongside San Francisco Golden Gate Gales, Chicago Mustangs, Houston Stars, Vancouver Royal Canadians and Dallas Tornado.  These teams were represented by ADO Den Haag, Cagliari Calcio, Bangu AC, Sunderland and  Dundee United. Of the twelve teams in the league, Wolves with a team coached by Ronnie Allen and featuring Derek Dougan, emerged as one of the strongest sides. After winning the Western Division, a flip of a coin gave them the right to host the championship play-off game against the Eastern Division champions, Washington Whips, who were represented by Aberdeen. The match drew 17,824 to Los Angeles Coliseum. Wolves won the championship beating the Whips 6–5 after 36 minutes of extra-time. Four goals were scored within a 4-minute period midway through the second half and each team scored during extra time. The game was decided after Whips defender Ally Shewan scored an own goal.

NASL
In December 1967 the USA merged with the National Professional Soccer League to form the North American Soccer League. As a result, Wolves became founding members of the new league. During the inaugural 1968 season Wolves played in the Pacific Division alongside the San Diego Toros, Oakland Clippers and Vancouver Royals. With a team coached by Ray Wood and featuring  Carlos Metidieri, but no Wolverhampton Wanderers players, they failed to repeat the success of the previous season. After finishing third in their division, Wolves were one of several NASL franchises that folded after just one season. The idea of importing teams to represent franchises was revived during the 1969 North American Soccer League season and Wolverhampton Wanderers returned to the United States, this time representing Kansas City Spurs, and winning the NASL International Cup.

Year-by-year

Coaches
  Ronnie Allen
  Ray Wood

Players

Legacy
In 2014, the Wolves name was resurrected by a United Premier Soccer League team called the LA Wolves FC.

See also

Los Angeles Toros
Los Angeles Aztecs
California Surf
Los Angeles Salsa
Los Angeles Skyhawks
LA Galaxy
Chivas USA
L.A. Wolves FC

References

External links
Team stats A
Team stats B
 List of LA Wolves players
 1966 in American soccer
 1967 in American soccer
 1968 in American soccer
 1969 in American soccer

 
Soccer clubs in Greater Los Angeles
Soccer clubs in California
North American Soccer League (1968–1984) teams
Defunct soccer clubs in California
Wolverhampton Wanderers F.C.
United Soccer Association franchises
Association football clubs established in 1966
Association football clubs disestablished in 1968
1966 establishments in California
1968 disestablishments in California
Defunct sports teams in California